Wesley Koolhof and Matwé Middelkoop were the defending champions but chose not to participate.

Andrej Martin and Hans Podlipnik won the title, defeating Rameez Junaid and Mateusz Kowalczyk 4–6, 7–6(7–3), [12–10] in the final.

Seeds

Draw

References
 Main Draw

ATP Challenger Torino - Doubles